Aquiluna is a genus of bacteria from the order Actinomycetales. As of 2022, Aquiluna is a monotypic genus, with the only validly published species being Aquiluna borgonia. The genus was first proposed in 2009, but its type species Candiatus Aquiluna rubra was not validly published.

References

Actinomycetales
Monotypic bacteria genera
Taxa described in 2021